Ordonka is a small river of Poland, a tributary of the Warta near Masłońskie.

Rivers of Poland
Rivers of Silesian Voivodeship